Joel Vinícius Silva dos Anjos (born 25 November 1994) is a Brazilian footballer who plays as a forward for Malaysia Super League club UiTM.

External links 

1994 births
Living people
Association football forwards
Than Quang Ninh FC players
V.League 1 players
Footballers from São Paulo
Brazilian footballers
Brazilian expatriate footballers
Expatriate footballers in the Czech Republic